Sir Richard Rodney Bennett  (29 March 193624 December 2012) was an English composer of film, TV and concert music, and also a jazz pianist and occasional vocalist. He was based in New York City from 1979 until his death there in 2012.

Life and career 
Bennett was born at Broadstairs, Kent, but was raised in Devon during World War II. His mother, Joan Esther, née Spink (1901–1983) was a pianist who had trained with Gustav Holst and sang in the first professional performance of The Planets. His father, Rodney Bennett (1890–1948), was a children's book author, poet and lyricist, who worked with Roger Quilter on his theatre works and provided new words for some of the numbers in the Arnold Book of Old Songs.

Bennett was a pupil at Leighton Park School. He later studied at the Royal Academy of Music with Howard Ferguson and Lennox Berkeley. Ferguson regarded him as extraordinarily brilliant, having perhaps the greatest talent of any British composer in his generation, though lacking in a personal style. During this time, Bennett attended some of the Darmstadt summer courses in 1955, where he was exposed to serialism. He later spent two years in Paris as a student of the prominent serialist Pierre Boulez between 1957 and 1959. He always used both his first names after finding another Richard Bennett active in music.

Bennett taught at the Royal Academy of Music between 1963 and 1965, at the Peabody Institute in Baltimore, United States from 1970 to 1971, and was later International Chair of Composition at the Royal Academy of Music between 1994 and the year 2000. He was appointed a Commander of the Order of the British Empire (CBE) in 1977, and was knighted in 1998.

Bennett produced over 200 works for the concert hall, and 50 scores for film and television. He was also a writer and performer of jazz songs for 50 years. Immersed in the techniques of the European avant-garde via his contact with Boulez, Bennett subsequently developed his own dramato-abstract style. In his later years, he adopted an increasingly tonal idiom.

Bennett regularly performed as a jazz pianist, with such singers as Cleo Laine, Marion Montgomery (until her death in 2002), Mary Cleere Haran (until her death in 2011), and more recently with Claire Martin, performing the Great American Songbook. Bennett and Martin performed at such venues as The Oak Room at the Algonquin Hotel in New York, and The Pheasantry and Ronnie Scott's Jazz Club in London.

In later years, in addition to his musical activities, Bennett became known as an artist working in the medium of collage. He exhibited these collages several times in England, including at the Holt Festival, Norfolk in 2011, and at the Swaledale Festival, Yorkshire, in 2012. The first exhibition of his collages was in London in 2010, at the South Kensington and Chelsea Mental Health Centre, curated by the Nightingale Project, a charity that takes music and art into hospitals. Bennett was a patron of this charity. Bennett is honoured with four photographic portraits in the collection of the National Portrait Gallery, London.

Bennett was homosexual and in 1995 Gay Times nominated him as one of the most influential homosexuals in music.

Anthony Meredith's biography of Bennett was published in November 2010. Bennett is survived by his sister Meg (born 1930), the poet M. R. Peacocke, with whom he collaborated on a number of vocal works.

Bennett's cremated remains are buried in Section 112, Plot 45456 at Green-wood Cemetery, Brooklyn. His grave is marked by a grey granite headstone.

Music
Despite his early studies in modernist techniques, Bennett's tastes were eclectic. He wrote in a wide range of styles, including jazz, for which he had a particular fondness. Early on, he began to write music for feature films. He said that it was as if the different styles of music that he was writing went on 'in different rooms, albeit in the same house'. Later in his career the different aspects all became equally celebrated – for example in his 75th birthday year (2011), there were numerous concerts featuring all the different strands of his work. At the BBC Proms for example his Murder on the Orient Express Suite was performed in a concert of film music, and in the same season his Dream Dancing and Jazz Calendar were also featured. Also at the Wigmore Hall, London, on 23 March 2011 (a few days before his 75th birthday), a double concert took place in which his Debussy-inspired piece Sonata After Syrinx was performed in the first concert, and in the Late Night Jazz Event which followed, Bennett and Claire Martin performed his arrangements of the Great American Songbook (Cole Porter, George Gershwin, Rodgers and Hart and so on). See also Tom Service's appreciation of Bennett's music published in The Guardian in July 2012.

Film and television scores
He wrote music for films and television; among his scores were the Doctor Who story The Aztecs (1964) for television, and the feature films Billion Dollar Brain (1967), Lady Caroline Lamb (1972) and Equus (1977). His scores for Far from the Madding Crowd (1967), Nicholas and Alexandra (1971), and Murder on the Orient Express (1974), each earned him Academy Award nominations, with Murder on the Orient Express gaining a BAFTA award. Later works include Enchanted April (1992), Four Weddings and a Funeral (1994), and The Tale of Sweeney Todd (1998). He was also a prolific composer of orchestral works, piano solos, choral works and operas. Despite this eclecticism, Bennett's music rarely involved stylistic crossover.

Selected works

Instrumental works
Sonata for piano (1954, first published work)
Impromptus (for guitar) (1968)
Viola Concerto (1973). Commissioned by the Northern Sinfonia for Roger Best.
Concerto for alto saxophone
Scena II (for solo cello; commissioned by the Music Department of the University College of North Wales, Bangor, with funds from Welsh Arts Council, first performed by Judith Mitchell 25 April 1974
Concerto for Stan Getz (tenor saxophone, timpani & strings) (1990)
Dream Sequence for cello and piano – first performed in December 1994 at the Wigmore Hall, London by Julian Lloyd Webber and John Lenehan
Elegy for Davis
Harpsichord Concerto (1980). Premiere conducted by Leonard Slatkin. St. Louis Symphony Orchestra. Richard Rodney Bennett, harpsichord.  
Fanfare for brass quintet (2012)
Farnham Festival Overture (1964) for orchestra
The Four Seasons (1991) for Symphonic Wind Ensemble
A Little Suite, based on selections from Rodney Bennett's song cycles The Insect World and The Aviary.
Morning Music for wind band
 Music for Strings
Over the Hills and Far Away for piano 4 hands (1991)
Party Piece for orchestra
Reflections on a Sixteenth Century Tune for string orchestra or double wind quintet (1999)
Sonata for solo guitar (1983)
Sonatina for solo clarinet
Summer Music for flute and piano
Symphony No. 1 (1965)
Symphony No. 2 (1968). Commissioned by the New York Philharmonic Orchestra
Symphony No. 3 (1987)
Marimba Concerto (1988)
Percussion Concerto (1990). Commissioned by and first performed at St Magnus Festival, Orkney, soloist Dame Evelyn Glennie, 1990
Trumpet Concerto for trumpet and wind orchestra
Partridge Pie based on The Twelve Days of Christmas
After Syrinx I for oboe and piano
After Syrinx II for solo marimba
Lilliburlero Variations for 2 pianos (2008) commissioned by the Dranoff 2 Piano Foundation in Miami

Operas
The Ledge (libretto by Adrian Mitchell) – 1961
The Midnight Thief (libretto by Ian Serraillier) – 1964
The Mines of Sulphur (libretto by Beverley Cross) – 1965
A Penny for a Song – 1967
All the King's Men (libretto by Beverley Cross) – 1968
Victory (libretto by Beverley Cross) – 1970

Ballet
Jazz Calendar – 1968
Isadora – 1981

Choral and vocal works
 Nonsense (chorus and piano duet) a setting of the seven poems by Mervyn Peake – 1984
A Good-Night – 1999
Missa Brevis – 1990
Sea Change – 1983
Spells, written for soprano Jane Manning
Five Carols: There is No Rose, Out of Your Sleep, That Younge Child, Sweet was the Song, Susanni Written for St Matthew's Church Northampton – 1967
On Christmas Day to My Heart, written in 1998 for the Festival of Nine Lessons and Carols at King's College Chapel, Cambridge in 1999.
The Garden – A Serenade to Glimmerglass, commissioned by Nicholas Russell for Glimmerglass Opera in honour of Stewart Robertson for its Young American Artists Program – 2006
 The Birds Lament
 "Tom o' Bedlam's Song" (voice and cello)1961

Albums
Solo:
2007 "Richard Rodney Bennett: Words And Music" (Chandos)
2002 Take Love Easy (Audiophile)
1995 A Different Side of Sondheim (DRG)
1994 Harold Arlen's Songs (Audiophile)
1992 "I Never Went Away" (Delos)
with Marion Montgomery
1977 Surprise Surprise
1978 Town and Country
1984 Puttin' On the Ritz
with Carol Sloane (singer)
1988 Lush Life
1989 Love You Madly (Contemporary)
with Chris Connor (singer)
1991 Classic (Contemporary)
1991 New Again (Contemporary)
with Mary Cleere Haran (singer)
1995 This Funny World: Mary Cleere Haran Sings Lyrics By Hart (Varèse Sarabande)
1998 Pennies From Heaven: Movie Songs From The Depression Era (Angel Records) 
1999 The Memory Of All That: Gershwin On Broadway and In Hollywood (2011 reissue)
2002 Crazy Rhythm: Manhattan in the 20s (Varèse Sarabande)
with Claire Martin
2005 When Lights Are Low
2010 Witchcraft
2013 Say It Isn't So
Opera
2005 The Mines of Sulphur (Chandos)
Orchestral
1968 Symphony No. 1 (with works by Bax and Berkeley) – Royal Philharmonic Orchestra, Igor Buketoff (RCA)
1972 Jazz Calendar / Piano Concerto – Stephen Bishop-Kovacevich, London Symphony Orchestra, Alexander Gibson (Philips)
1979 Spells / Aubade – Jane Manning, Philharmonia Orchestra, David Willcocks, David Atherton (Argo)
1995 Partita / Four Jazz Songs / Enchanted April Suite – Britten Sinfonia, Nicholas Cleobury, the composer, Neil Richardson (BBC)
1996 Diversions / Symphony No. 3 / Concerto for Violin and Orchestra – Monte Carlo Philharmonic Orchestra, James DePreist (Koch)
2017 Bennett: Orchestral Works , Vol 1 (Celebration; Marimba Concerto; Symphony No. 3; Summer Music; Sinfonietta) – BBC Scottish Symphony Orchestra, John Wilson (Chandos)
2018 Bennett: Orchestral Works , Vol 2 (Concerto for Stan Getz; Symphony No. 2; Serenade; Partita) – BBC Scottish Symphony Orchestra, John Wilson (Chandos)
2019 Bennett: Orchestral Works, Vol 3 (Symphony No. 1; A History of the Dansant; Reflections on a 16th Century Tune; Zodiac) – BBC Scottish Symphony Orchestra, John Wilson (Chandos)
2020 Bennett: Orchestral Works, Vol 4 (Aubade; Piano Concerto; Anniversaries; Country Dances, Book One, Troubadour Music) – BBC Scottish Symphony Orchestra, John Wilson (Chandos)
Choral
1999 Stuff and Nonsense  (Astounding Sounds for London Oriana Choir)
2013 Letters to Lindbergh (Signum UK)
2013 Sea Change: Choral Music of Richard Rodney Bennett – The Cambridge Singers, the composer and John Rutter (Collegium Records)

Selected TV and filmography

 Pickup Alley (1957)
 Face in the Night (1957)
 The Safecracker (1958)
 Indiscreet (1958)
 The Man Inside (1959)
 The Man Who Could Cheat Death (1959)
 The Angry Hills (1959)
 Chance Meeting (1959)
 The Devil's Disciple (1959)
 The Mark (1961)
 Only Two Can Play (1962)
 Satan Never Sleeps (1962)
 The Wrong Arm of the Law (1963)
 Heavens Above! (1963)
 Billy Liar (1963)
 Hamlet at Elsinore (1964) (TV)
 One Way Pendulum (1964)
 The Wednesday Play (1964–1967) (TV, 3 episodes)
 The Nanny (1965)
 The Witches (1966)
 Far from the Madding Crowd (1967) (nominated for Academy Award for Best Original Score)
 Billion Dollar Brain (1967)
 Secret Ceremony (1968)
 The Buttercup Chain (1970)
 Figures in a Landscape (1970)
 Nicholas and Alexandra (1971) (nominated for Academy Award for Best Original Score (Dramatic))
 Lady Caroline Lamb (1973)
 Voices (1973)
 Murder on the Orient Express (1974) (nominated for Academy Award for Best Original Dramatic Score)
 Permission to Kill (1975)
 Sherlock Holmes in New York (1976) (TV)
 The Accuser aka L'Imprécateur (1977)
 Equus (1977)
 The Brink's Job (1978)
 Yanks (1979)
 The Return of the Soldier (1982)
 Knockback (1984) (TV)
 The Ebony Tower (1984) (TV)
 Murder with Mirrors (1985) (TV)
 Tender is the Night (1985) (TV mini-series)
 Poor Little Rich Girl: The Barbara Hutton Story (1987) (TV)
 The Charmer (1987) (TV mini-series)
 American Playhouse (1988) (TV, 1 episode)
 The Attic: The Hiding of Anne Frank (1988) (TV)
 Enchanted April (1991)
 Four Weddings and a Funeral (1994)
 Swann (1996)
 The Tale of Sweeney Todd (1997) (TV)
 Gormenghast (2000) (TV mini-series)

References

Further reading
 Richard Rodney Bennett: The Complete Musician. (Authorised biography.) Anthony Meredith (with Paul Harris). Omnibus. .
 "Composer Sir Richard Rodney Bennett dies aged 76." Charlotte Higgins, The Guardian, 25 December 2012.
 "Sir Richard Rodney Bennett." (Daily Telegraph Obituary.) 25 December 2012.
 "Richard Rodney Bennett, British Composer, Dies at 76." By Zachary Wolfe, The New York Times, 30 December 2012.
 Timothy Reynish, "British Wind Music", paper presented to the 2005 CBDNA National Conference

External links

Biography and list of works, published by Novello & Company Ltd
 Richard Rodney Bennett biography and works on the UE website

 Conversation between Richard Rodney Bennett and Claire Martin – British Library sound recording
Interview with Richard Rodney Bennett by Bruce Duffie, 25 March 1988
Richard Rodney Bennett at Epdlp (Spanish)
Appearance on Desert Island Discs, 19 October 1997 
 

1936 births
2012 deaths
20th-century classical composers
21st-century classical composers
LGBT classical composers
LGBT film score composers
LGBT jazz composers
Academics of the Royal Academy of Music
Alumni of the Royal Academy of Music
Fellows of the Royal Academy of Music
Best Original Music BAFTA Award winners
Commanders of the Order of the British Empire
English opera composers
Male opera composers
British ballet composers
English film score composers
English male film score composers
English jazz composers
Male jazz composers
English classical composers
English male classical composers
Knights Bachelor
Composers awarded knighthoods
Light music composers
Burials at Green-Wood Cemetery
People educated at Leighton Park School
People from Broadstairs
Pupils of Lennox Berkeley
Musicians from Kent
20th-century English composers
20th-century British male musicians
20th-century British musicians
21st-century British male musicians
20th-century jazz composers
21st-century jazz composers